Carlton was an electoral district of the Legislative Assembly in the Australian state of Victoria located in the inner-Melbourne suburb of Carlton from 1877 to 1958.

The district was defined as:

Members for Carlton

Election results

External links
Election Notice, Carlton - 1897

References

Former electoral districts of Victoria (Australia)
1877 establishments in Australia
1958 disestablishments in Australia